Luoshan County (postal: Loshan) is a county in the southeast of Henan province, China, bordering Hubei province to the south. It is under the administration of Xinyang city. The primary dialect is the Xinyang city dialect of Southwestern Mandarin.

Historical evolution 
The Western Han Dynasty began to set up Jixian County, belonging to Jiangxia County. The Wei and Jin Dynasties use the Chinese system. The Southern Song Dynasty is divided into the county of Baocheng County, which belongs to Yiyang County. Nanqi was changed to Baocheng as Baocheng, which belongs to Beiyiyang County. In the Northern Wei Dynasty, Baocheng County, Qi County, and Dongsui County were placed. Baocheng County and Qi County belong to Qi'an County. North Qihe County is located in Gao'an County, still in Qi'an County.

In the third year of the Kaihuang Emperor (583 years), Gao'an County was merged into Zhongshan County. In the 16th year of Kaihuang (596), it was analyzed that Zhongshan County was located in Luoshan County and belonged to Yiyang County. Because of the southwest of the county, there is Xiaoluo Mountain, hence the name. Tang Wude four years (612 years) set South Luozhou, led Luoshan County. Wude eight years (625 years) South Luozhou waste, Luoshan County is Shenzhou. Five generations with the Tang system. Song Kaibao nine years (976 years) Luoshan County waste. In the third year of the reign of Emperor Xixi (986), it belonged to Xinyang Army.

In the 20th year of Yuanzhiyuan (1283), Xinyang Prefecture was reorganized in Luoshan County. The former Luoshan County moved to the southwest, and it was called Luoshan New County. It belonged to Xinyang Prefecture of Suining.

In the first year of Ming Hongwu (1368), the county was restored to the old, still known as Luoshan County, belonging to Xinyang Prefecture. In the 7th year of Hongwu (1374), it was changed to Suining. Chenghua Decade (1475) is a copy of Xinyang Prefecture. Luoshan in the Qing Dynasty belonged to Suining.

In the 2nd year of the Republic of China (1913), the waste state was changed to the county, and Luoshan County belonged to Henan South Road, and later changed to Xiangyang Road. In the 16th year of the Republic of China (1927), it was abolished and directly under Henan Province. In 17 years (1928), Henan Province was divided into 14 administrative districts, and Luoshan was the seventh (Xinyang) Inspector Administrative Region. In the 21st year of the Republic of China (1932), it was assigned to the ninth (Huangchuan) administrative inspectorate of Henan Province. In the 22nd year of the Republic of China (1933), it was analyzed in the southern part of the county. It was newly established in Lishan County, Hubei Province, now Dawu County.

In March 1949, the Chinese People's Liberation Army occupied Luoshan, belonging to the Huangchuan area. In 1952, the Huangchuan area was merged into the Xinyang area, and Luoshan was merged. In 1998, Xinyang withdrew from the city, and Luoshan was the county.

Administrative divisions
As 2012, this county is divided to 9 towns and 10 townships.
Towns

Townships

Climate

References

 
County-level divisions of Henan
Xinyang